George Sampson (7 July 1845 – 17 March 1911) was a New Zealand cricketer. He played one first-class match for Otago in 1874/75.

See also
 List of Otago representative cricketers

References

External links
 

1845 births
1911 deaths
New Zealand cricketers
Otago cricketers
Cricketers from Taranaki